Wava Banes Turner Henry (March 14, 1920 – October 16, 2012) was the founder of Tau Beta Sigma, National Honorary Band Sorority, while attending Texas Tech College.

Biography
Wava Banes was born on March 14, 1920, in Cleveland, Oklahoma. In 1937, she began her studies at Texas Tech College, where she graduated with a degree in Band Music. During her time at Texas Tech, she was one of the first female members in the band, and the first female to graduate with her degree. Additionally, she was motivated by a desire for women to have the same opportunities as men, and founded the Tau Beta Sigma Club in 1939. In 1946, the club became Tau Beta Sigma, National Honorary Band Sorority.

In 1941 she graduated from college and married her first husband, Jack Turner, who was a member of the Alpha Omicron chapter of Kappa Kappa Psi. Following her graduation, she also taught band in the state of Texas, before returning to school. Following her husband's death in 1958, she returned to school to receive certification in counseling and mathematics. Eventually, she moved to Aspen, Colorado, in 1961, where she taught in the school system.

While teaching she ceased to be involved with the activities of Tau Beta Sigma, although she attended the 1971 National Convention, and continued to attend conventions until her death.

In 1981 she married Reese Henry, adopting her present name.

On October 16, 2012, Wava died of natural causes in Grand Junction, Colorado, being survived by her husband, daughter, and three granddaughters.

References

1920 births
2012 deaths
People from Grand Junction, Colorado
People from Cleveland, Oklahoma
Texas Tech University alumni
Tau Beta Sigma